Elections to Rochford Council were held on 2 May 1996.  One third of the council was up for election.

Results summary

Ward results

Ashingdon

Downhall

Grange and Rawreth

Hawkwell East

Hawkwell West

Hockley Central

Hockley East

Hockley West

Hullbridge Riverside

Hullbridge South

Lodge

Rayleigh Central

Rochford St. Andrew's

References

1996
1996 English local elections
1990s in Essex